Ajoy Mehta is the former Municipal Commissioner of Mumbai. He succeeded Sitaram Kunte as the Municipal Commissioner of Mumbai. He has been appointed as the Chief Secretary of MH on 10 May 2019.

Development
After taking over charge as Municipal Commissioner Ajoy Mehta has started work on  affordable housing in the draft development plan. He has also tackled the sanitation issue in Mumbai.

Civil service 
Ajoy Mehta is a 1984 Cadre from the  Maharashtra Batch of the IAS.
He joined IAS after completing his btech from IIT BHU.

References

Government of Maharashtra
Indian Administrative Service officers